The 2015–16 Welsh Premier League was the seventh season of the Women's Welsh Premier League, the top level women's football league in Wales. The season began on 13 September 2015 and ended on 30 May 2016.

Cardiff Met. Ladies were the defending champions and retained the title after completing an unbeaten season, winning 18 and drawing 2 of their 20 games.

Shannon Evans from Cardiff City won the top goalscorer award after scoring 37 goals, despite being a makeshift forward due to injury. Player of the Season was won by Cardiff Met. captain Emily Allen.

Clubs

Despite finishing 6th in the 2014–15 season, Wrexham ladies dropped out of the league for the 2015–16 season citing a lack of players. Cyncoed Ladies replaced Wrexham Ladies in the league, after winning the South Wales Women's and Girls League Division 1. 11 teams ended up competing in the league.

Standings

League Cup
This was the third season of the WPWL Cup and Swansea City were the third different team to win the competition. Aberystwyth Town Ladies, Cwmbran Celtic Ladies, Cyncoed Ladies and MBI Llandudno all received byes into round two and Wrexham Ladies were forced to withdraw which allowed Swansea City Ladies a bye into the quarter finals. The cup was won by Swansea City, beating defending champions PILCS 4–0 with goals from Katy Hosford (2), Emma Benyon and Sophie Hancocks.

Round One
Wrexham Ladies withdrew allowing Swansea City a bye into the quarter finals.

Quarter-finals

Semi-finals

Final

References 

2015-16
Wales Women